Maricet Fernández (born 6 December 1989) is a team handball player from Cuba. She plays on the Cuba women's national handball team, and participated at the 2011 World Women's Handball Championship held in Brazil.

References

1989 births
Living people
Cuban female handball players
Expatriate handball players
Cuban expatriate sportspeople in Spain
21st-century Cuban women